Gian Carlo Venturini (born 25 February 1962) is a Sammarinese politician and one of the Captains Regent with Maurizio Rattini from 1 October 1996 until 1 April 1997 and the second time with Marco Nicolini from 1 April until 1 October 2021.

Life
Born in City of San Marino, Venturini obtained the Diploma of laboratory technician at the University of Urbino in 1984, and is an employee of the Institute for Social Security.

He has been a member of the Sammarinese Christian Democratic Party since 1986 and held the position of Deputy Secretary from 1997 to April 2002 and subsequently from March 2007 to December 2008.
 
From 1989 to 1991 he held the position of Captain of Borgo Maggiore and in 1993 he was elected a member of the Grand and General Council; he was then reconfirmed in the general elections of 1998, 2001, 2006, 2008 and the last of 2012.
 
He held the position of Captain Regent of the Republic of San Marino in the semester 1 October 1996 – 1 April 1997.
In recent years he has also been a member of various Permanent Council Commissions, of the Council of XII and of the Urban Planning Commission, now the Commission for Territorial Policies.
 
He was a member of the Congress of State in 2002 as Secretary of State for Health and Social Security, from December 2002 as Secretary of State for Labor and Cooperation, then from December 2003 to June 2006 Secretary of State for the Territory and the Environment, Agriculture and Relations with the AASP
 
From 3 December 2008, for the XXVII Legislature, he was appointed Secretary of State for the Territory and the Environment, Agriculture and Relations with the AASP.
 
Since July 2012 he has been conferred ad interim the delegation: Justice and Relations with the Giunte di Castello.
From 5 December 2012, for the XXVIII Legislature, he was appointed Secretary of State for Internal Affairs, Public Administration, Justice and Relations with the Castle Councils.

References

1962 births
Living people
People from the City of San Marino
University of Urbino alumni
Captains Regent of San Marino
Members of the Grand and General Council
Sammarinese Christian Democratic Party politicians
Secretaries of State for Agriculture of San Marino
Secretaries of State for Environment of San Marino
Secretaries of State for Interior of San Marino
Secretaries of State for Justice of San Marino
Secretaries of State for Health of San Marino
Secretaries of State for Labor of San Marino